Ashdown House is a country house near Forest Row, in East Sussex, England. It is a Grade II* listed building. One of the first houses in England to be built in the Greek Revival architectural style, it was built in 1793 as the second independent work of Benjamin Henry Latrobe, and his last work in Britain prior to his emigration to the United States. Latrobe's domes at Ashdown have been described by scholars as 'miniature prototypes' for his domes at the United States Capitol. Described by Nikolaus Pevsner as 'very perfect indeed', the building served as a prep school from 1886 to 2020, educating many notable alumni.

In August 2021 the property was sold to a property developer for £5 million. Richard Eden confirmed that the owner,  Cothill Trust, had exchanged contracts with the developer, whose name was not disclosed. The next highest bidder was reportedly an educational establishment that offered the trust £4.5 million.

History
Ashdown House was given its name by John Trayton Fuller upon his purchase of the site, by Act of Parliament, for £10,000 in 1793. The land had previously comprised the Manor of Lavertye, first recorded in 1285. In 1597, it was part of the Buckhurst estate, a house of brick and Horsham stone with "... several courtyards, gardens, orchards, closes, rooms, two old dwelling houses, and a great barn."

As a school
The school was founded in Brighton in 1843 as a boys' school and moved to Ashdown House in 1886. It first became co-educational in 1975. The last head teacher, from September 2019 to June 2020, was Hilary Phillips, previously of Monmouth School Girls' Prep.

Historic abuse allegations
Historical allegations of physical and sexual abuse in the 1970s by multiple former pupils, investigated by law firm Slater & Gordon in 2013, were followed by widespread recollections from former pupils that the regime at the school in the late 20th century had been spartan and unforgiving, with boys or entire classes regularly punished with canings. Abuse at the school is much of the subject of former pupil Alex Renton's book Stiff Upper Lip and his BBC Radio 4 documentary In Dark Corners, and is referred to in the memoirs of Andrew Mitchell.

In July 2014 Clive Williams, 69, who was headmaster from 1975 to 2003, was interviewed by Sussex Police following allegations of sexual assault and child neglect. A computer and documents were taken from his home for examination. He was released on bail the same day, until 11 November, and was understood not to have been charged.

In January 2023 David Price, 76, who taught at the school in the 1980s, was charged with three counts of indecent assault in the 1980s and was due in court in the following month. He was arrested after an 11-page account detailing alleged abuse was submitted to Cape Town police by a former pupil of Western Province preparatory school in the city. The complainant came forward after claims were made against Price and other former teachers by Alex Renton.

Notable former pupils

 David Armstrong-Jones, 2nd Earl of Snowdon, furniture maker
 Thomas Cholmondeley (1968–2016), Kenyan farmer
 Nicholas Coleridge, publisher
 Charlie Cox, actor
 James Innes, author
 Boris Johnson, former Prime Minister of the United Kingdom
 Jo Johnson, politician
 Rachel Johnson, writer and journalist
 Damian Lewis, actor
 Nick Macpherson, civil servant
 Andrew Mitchell, politician
 Alex Renton, journalist and author
 Joseph Simpson (1909–1968), Commissioner of the Metropolitan Police
 Fischer Watson (1884–1960), Royal Navy officer

References

External links 
 

Defunct schools in East Sussex
School buildings completed in 1794
Benjamin Henry Latrobe buildings and structures
Grade II* listed buildings in East Sussex
1886 establishments in England
Grade II* listed houses
2020 disestablishments in England
Educational institutions disestablished in 2020
Forest Row